Kuressaare is a town on Saaremaa island in Estonia. It is the administrative centre of Saaremaa Parish and the capital of Saare County. Kuressaare is the westernmost town in Estonia. The recorded population on 1 January 2018 was 13,276.

The town is situated on the southern coast of Saaremaa island, facing the Gulf of Riga of the Baltic Sea, and is served by the Kuressaare Airport, Roomassaare harbour, and Kuressaare yacht harbour.

Names

Kuressaare's historic name Arensburg (from Middle High German a(a)r: eagle, raptor) renders the Latin denotation arx aquilae for the city's castle. The fortress and the eagle, tetramorph symbol of Saint John the Evangelist, are also depicted on Kuressaare's coat of arms.

The town, which grew around the fortress, was simultaneously known as Arensburg and Kuressaarelinn; the latter name being a combination of Kuressaare—an ancient name of the Saaremaa Island—and linn, which means town. Alternatively, the town's name may come from kurg (crane) and saare (island), a name that may have come from the city's German name and coat of arms, or may have existed before German settlers arrived. Eventually, the town's name shortened to Kuressaare and became official in 1918 after Estonia had declared its independence from Bolshevist Russia. Under Soviet rule, the town was renamed Kingissepa in 1952. This name came from the Bolshevik Kuressaare-native Viktor Kingissepp executed in 1922. The name Kuressaare was restored in 1988.

History

The town first appeared on maps around 1154. The island of Saaremaa (German) was conquered by the Livonian Brothers of the Sword under Volkwin of Naumburg in 1227, who merged with the Teutonic Knights shortly afterwards. The first documentation of the castle (arx aquilae) was found in Latin texts written in 1381 and 1422. Over time, a town, which became known as Arensburg or Kuressaarelinn, grew and flourished around the fortress. It became the see of the Bishopric of Ösel-Wiek established by Albert of Riga in 1228, part of the Terra Mariana.

Johann von Münchhausen, bishop since 1542, converted to Protestantism. With the advance of the troops of Tsar Ivan IV of Russia in the course of the Livonian War, Münchhausen sold his lands to King Frederick II of Denmark in 1559 and returned to Germany. Frederick sent his younger brother Prince Magnus to Kuressaare where he was elected bishop the following year. It was through his influence that the city obtained its civic charter in 1563, modeled after that of Riga. The bishopric was finally secularised in 1572 and Kuressaare fell to the Danish Crown.

In 1645, it passed to Swedish control through the Treaty of Brömsebro after the Danish defeat in the Torstenson War. Queen Christina of Sweden granted her favourite, Magnus Gabriel de la Gardie, the title of Count of Arensburg, the German and Swedish name for Kuressaare at that time. The city was burnt to the ground by Russian troops in 1710 during the Great Northern War and suffered heavily from the plague. Abandoned by the Swedes, it was incorporated into the Governorate of Livonia of the Russian Empire through the Treaty of Nystad in 1721.

During the 19th century Kuressaare became a popular seaside resort on the Baltic coast. During World War I, between September and October 1917, German land and naval forces occupied Saaremaa with Operation Albion. During World War II, the Battle of Tehumardi took place. In October 1990, Kuressaare was the first town in Estonia to regain its self-governing status.

Neighborhoods of Kuressaare
There are nine neighborhoods of Kuressaare:
Ida-Niidu
Kesklinn
Kellamäe
Marientali
Põllu alev
Roomassaare
Smuuli
Suuremõisa
Tori.

Landmarks and culture

The medieval episcopal Kuressaare Castle today houses the Saaremaa Regional Museum. The original wooden castle was constructed between 1338 and 1380, although other sources claim a fortress was built in Kuressaare as early as 1260. In 1968, architect  began studies on Kuressaare Castle.

The town hall was originally built in 1654, and restored, retaining classicist and baroque features. It was last restored in the 1960s with dolomite stairs at the front. St Nicolaus Church was built in 1790.

The annual Saaremaa Opera Days (Saaremaa Ooperipäevad) have been held in Kuressaare each summer since 1999. Other festivals include Kuressaare Chamber Music Days (Kuressaare Kammermuusika Päevad), held since 1995 and Kuressaare Maritime Festival (Kuressaare Merepäevad), held since 1998.

Kuressaare also hosts the FC Kuressaare football club.

Climate

Economy

Transportation
Kuressaare is served by Kuressaare Airport, located on a peninsula southeast of the town. There is regular traffic to Tallinn, as well as seasonal flights to the island of Ruhnu.

There are bus connections around the island, as well as with Kuivastu on Muhu Island, a ferry terminal with connection to the mainland.

In 1917, during the German occupation, an urban railway was built in Kuressaare, and in 1918, it was transferred to the town administration. It connected the port with the city center/ One of the stations was provisionally located in Kurhouse, and in 1924, the dedicated Park Station was built. The railway functioned until the 1930s when it was gradually disused and mostly dismantled. An attempt to revive the railway in the beginning of the 1950s, during the Soviet period, was unsuccessful, and ended up with rails fully removed from the streets.

Notable people
Adam Georg von Agthe (1777–1826), Russian military officer
Tiiu Aro (born 1952), Estonian physician and politician
Eugen Dücker (1841–1916), Baltic German painter
Maria Faust (born 1979), Estonian saxophone player and composer
Bernd Freytag von Loringhoven (1914–2007), German military officer
Louis Kahn (1901–1974), American architect
Madis Kallas (born 1981), Estonian decathlete and politician
Viktor Kingissepp (1888–1922), Estonian communist politician
Heli Lääts (1932–2018), Estonian singer
Karl Patrick Lauk (born 1997), Estonian cyclist
Tullio Liblik (born 1964), Estonian entrepreneur
Jörgen Liik (born 1990), Estonian actor
Ivo Linna (born 1949), Estonian singer
Richard Maack (1825–1886), Russian naturalist
Konstantin Märska (1896–1951), Estonian cinematographer and film director
Gerd Neggo (1891–1974), Estonian dancer and choreographer
Marek Niit (born 1987), Estonian sprinter
Sulev Nõmmik (1931–1992), Estonian actor, director, humorist and dancer
Tiidrek Nurme (born 1985), Estonian runner
Margus Oopkaup (born 1959), Estonian actor
Mikk Pahapill (born 1983), Estonian decathlete
Grete Paia (born 1995), Estonian singer and songwriter
Tõnis Palts (born 1953), Estonian politician and businessman
Jüri Pihl (1954–2019), Estonian police officer and politician
Keith Pupart (born 1985), Estonian volleyball player
Ilmar Raag (born 1968), Estonian film director and media personality
Mihkel Räim (born 1993), Estonian cyclist
Tuuli Rand (born 1990), Estonian singer
Getter Saar (born 1992), Estonian badminton player
Indrek Saar (born 1973), Estonian actor and politician
Benno Schotz (1891–1984), Scottish sculptor
Hannibal Sehested (1609–1666), Danish statesman
Karen Sehested (1606–1672), Danish court official
Adeele Sepp (born 1989), Estonian actor
Jaanus Tamkivi (born 1959), Estonian politician
Tarmo Teder (born 1958), Estonian writer and critic
Ivar Karl Ugi (1930–2005), German chemist
Voldemar Väli (1903–1997), Estonian wrestler
Mihail Velsvebel (1926–2008), Estonian runner
Alexander Vostokov (1781–1864), Russian philologist
Richard Otto Zöpffel (1843–1891), Baltic German theologian

Twin towns and sister cities
The former municipality of Kuressaare was twinned with:
 Ekenäs, Finland (since 21 November 1988)
 Kuurne, Belgium (since 9 August 1998)
 Mariehamn, Finland (since 24 October 1991)
 Rønne, Denmark (since 3 October 1991)
 Skövde, Sweden (since 23 June 1993)
 Talsi, Latvia (since 27 May 1998)
 Turku, Finland (since 30 May 1996)
 Vammala, Finland (since 30 June 1994)

Significant depictions in popular culture
 Arensburg (Kuressaare) is one of the starting towns of the State of the Teutonic Order in the turn-based strategy game Medieval II: Total War: Kingdoms.

See also

List of cities and towns in Estonia

References

Notes

Sources
Е. М. Поспелов (Ye. M. Pospelov). "Имена городов: вчера и сегодня (1917–1992). Топонимический словарь." (City Names: Yesterday and Today (1917–1992). Toponymic Dictionary.) Москва, "Русские словари", 1993.

External links

 
Saaremaa
Cities and towns in Estonia
Former municipalities of Estonia
Populated coastal places in Estonia
Populated places in Saare County
Gulf of Riga
Spa towns in Estonia
Kreis Ösel
Populated places established in the 1380s
1380s establishments in Europe
Port cities and towns in Estonia